Wayne Highlands is a third-class school district in Wayne County, Pennsylvania. The district's population was 20,870 at the time of the 2010 United States Census.

Organized on July 1, 1970, the district operates preschools, four elementary schools, one middle school, and one high school. According to federal census data, the district's population decreased by 636 residents from 21,506 residents in 2000. In 2009, the District residents’ per capita income was $17,330, while the median family income was $40,683. In the Commonwealth, the median family income was $49,501  and the United States median family income was $49,445, in 2010.

Regions and constituent municipalities

The district is divided into three regions, which include the following municipalities:

Region I
Buckingham Township
Damascus Township
Manchester Township
Preston Township
Scott Township

Region II
Bethany Borough
Dyberry Township
Honesdale Borough
Lebanon Township

Region III
Berlin Township
Cherry Ridge Township
Oregon Township
Prompton Borough
Texas Township (partially in the Wallenpaupack Area School District)

Schools
 Damascus Area School
 Honesdale High School
 Lakeside Elementary School
 Preston Area School
 Stourbridge Primary School
 Wayne Highlands Middle School

Extracurriculars
Wayne Highlands School District offers a wide variety of clubs, activities and an extensive sports program.

Sports
The District funds:

Boys
Baseball - AAA
Basketball- AAA
Cross Country - AA
Football - AAA
Golf - AAA
Soccer - AA
Tennis - AA
Track and Field - AAA
Wrestling - AAA

Girls
Basketball - AAA
Cross Country - AA
Field Hockey - AAA
Soccer (Fall) - AA
Softball - AAA
Girls' Tennis - AA
Track and Field - AAA
Wrestling - AAA

Middle School Sports

Boys
Baseball
Basketball
Cross Country
Football
Soccer
Track and Field
Wrestling	

Girls
Basketball
Cross Country
Field Hockey
Softball 
Soccer (fall)
Track and Field
Wrestling

According to PIAA directory July 2012

See also
 Wayne County, Pennsylvania
 List of school districts in Pennsylvania

References

External links
 

School districts established in 1970
School districts in Wayne County, Pennsylvania
1970 establishments in Pennsylvania